The FA Cup is the national knockout football tournament in England.

FA Cup may also refer to the following tournaments:

by country/territory
 Antigua and Barbuda FA Cup
 Australia Cup
 The Bahamas
 Grand Bahama FA Cup
 New Providence FA Cup
 Bahraini FA Cup
 Barbados FA Cup
 Bermuda FA Cup
 Brunei FA Cup
 Cayman Islands FA Cup
 Chinese FA Cup
 CTFA Cup (Chinese Taipei FA cup); see Chinese Taipei Football Association
 Ghanaian FA Cup
 Guam FA Cup
 Guernsey FA Cup
 Korean FA Cup
 Lebanese FA Cup
 Hong Kong FA Cup
 Iraq FA Cup
 Isle of Man FA Cup
 Jordan FA Cup
 Macedonian Football Cup
 Malaysia FA Cup
 Maldives FA Cup
 Namibia FA Cup
 Saint Lucia FA Cup
 Senegal FA Cup
 Seychelles FA Cup
 Sierra Leonean FA Cup
 Sri Lanka FA Cup
 Lebanese FA Cup
 Nigerian FA Cup
 Scottish Cup
 Tanzania FA Cup
 Thai FA Cup
 Turks and Caicos FA Cup
 Vanuatu Port Vila FA Cup
 Welsh Cup

See also
 Women's FA Cup